Luimbi (also known as Lwimbi, Luimbe, Lwimbe or Chiluimbi) is a minor Bantu language spoken in central Angola. It is related to Nkangala and Mbwela.

References

Chokwe-Luchazi languages
Languages of Angola